Olga Rudel-Zeynek (1871–1948), was an Austrian politician and journalist. She served as President of the Bundesrat in 1927–28 and 1932. 

The Bundesrat, Federal Council, is the representation of the States if Austria. She was a Member of the National Assembly 1920–27, of the Landtag of Steiermark and of the Bundesrat 1927–1933, as well as a and member of the leadership of the Christian Social Party.

References 

 Andrea Ertl: Rudel-Zeynek, Olga, geborene von Zeynek. In: Neue Deutsche Biographie (NDB). Band 22, Duncker & Humblot, Berlin 2005, S. 161 f.

1871 births
Presidents of the Austrian Federal Council
Members of the Federal Council (Austria)
Christian Social Party (Austria) politicians
Austrian women in politics
1948 deaths